The Academy of Canadian Cinema & Television's 16th Gemini Awards were held on October 29, 2001, to honour achievements in Canadian television. The awards show, which was hosted by Mike Bullard, took place at the Metro Toronto Convention Centre and was broadcast on CBC Television.

Awards

Best Dramatic Series
 Da Vinci's Inquest - Haddock Entertainment, Barna-Alper Productions, Alliance Atlantis Productions, Canadian Broadcasting Corporation. Producers: Chris Haddock, Laszlo Barna, Lynn Barr, Arvi Liimatainen
Blue Murder - Barna-Alper Productions, Canwest, North Bend Films. Producers: Laszlo Barna, Norman Denver, Steve Lucas
Drop the Beat - Back Alley Film Productions. Producers: Adrienne Mitchell, Susan Alexander, Janis Lundman, Suzanne Chapman
The Associates - Alliance Atlantis. Producers: Brian Dennis, Anne Marie La Traverse, Steve Blackman, Greg Ball, Alyson Feltes, Maureen McKeon
The Outer Limits - Alliance Atlantis, Atlantis Films, Showtime Networks, Trilogy Entertainment. Producers: John Watson, Richard Barton Lewis, Mark Stern, Brent Karl Clackson, Pen Densham, Sam Egan

Best Dramatic Miniseries
Nuremberg - Alliance Atlantis Communications, CTV Television Network, British American Entertainment, Cypress Films, Les Productions La Fête. Producers: Peter Sussman, Gerald W. Abrams, Alec Baldwin, Mychele Boudrais, Jon Cornick, Suzanne Girard, Ian McDougall
Haven - Alliance Atlantis Communications, Paulette Breen Productions. Producers: Peter Sussman, Dan Paulson, Mark Winemaker, Paulette Breen
Revenge of the Land - Bernard Zukerman Productions, Cinar. Producer: Bernard Zukerman

Best TV Movie
Scorn - Alliance Atlantis Communications, Barna-Alper Productions, Canadian Broadcasting Corporation, Eurasia Motion Pictures, Face to Face Media Society, Kinetic Productions. Producers: Christian Bruyere, Laszlo Barna, Maryke McEwen
Blessed Stranger: After Flight 111 - Big Motion Pictures, CTV Television Network, Salter Street Films. Producers: Wayne Grigsby, David MacLeod
Chasing Cain - Canadian Broadcasting Corporation, Salter Street Films. Producers: Michael Donovan, Bernard Zukerman, Jerry Ciccoritti
Lucky Girl - Alliance Atlantis Communications, Triptych Media. Producers: Anne Marie La Traverse, Louise Garfield
The Secret Life of Algernon - Marano Productions, Productions Phare Est. Producer: Nancy Marano

Best Comedy Program or Series
Made in Canada - Salter Street Films, Island Edge. Producers: Gerald Lunz, Michael Donovan
 John Callahan's Quads! - Nelvana, SBS independent, Animation Works, Media World Features, Film Victoria, ScreenWest, Lotteries Commission of Western Australia. Producers: Judy Malmgren, Michael Hirsh, Clive A. Smith, Marianne Culbert, Patricia R. Burns, Stephen Hodgins, John Tatoulis, John Callahan, Deborah Levin, Patrick Loubert
Jonovision - Canadian Broadcasting Corporation. Producers: Richard Mortimer, Lynn Harvey
The Red Green Show - Red Green Productions. Producer: Steve Smith
This Hour Has 22 Minutes - Salter Street Films, Canadian Broadcasting Corporation. Producers: Michael Donovan, Geoff D’Eon, Jack Kellum, Mark Farrell, Ginny Jones-Duzak

Best Music, Variety Program or Series
East Coast Music Awards - (East Coast Music Association, CBC Halifax). Producers: Geoff D’Eon, Jac Gautreau, Michael Lewis
History Bites - The History Channel. Producers: David C. Smith, Rick Green
Open Mike with Mike Bullard - The Comedy Network. Producers: Sean Tweedley, Sue Brophey, Barbara Bowlby, John Brunton, Al Magee
 YAA! The 11th Annual YTV Achievement Awards - YTV. Producer: Joanne P. Jackson

Best Performing Arts Program or Series, or Arts Documentary Program or Series
Great Performances: Don Giovanni Unmasked - Rhombus Media, Thirteen/WNET. Producers: Daniel Iron, Niv Fichman
 A Very Dangerous Pastime: A Devastatingly Simple Dance Guide - National Arts Centre. Producers: Cathy Levy, Allison Lewis, Laura Taler
Dinner at the Edge - Sienna Films. Producers: Anita Lee, Jennifer Kawaja, Sean Carley, Julia Sereny
Four Seasons - Rhombus Media, Veronica Tennant Productions. Producers: Daniel Iron, Veronica Tennant
Life and Times - Studio: The Life & Times of Alex Colville - 90th Parallel Productions, Canadian Broadcasting Corporation. Producers: Andrew Gregg, Gordon Henderson

Donald Brittain Award for Best Social/Political Documentary Program
Breakaway - A Tale of Two Survivors - Alchemy Notion Pictures. Producers: Mathew Welsh, Johanna Eliot, Johanna Lunn Montgomery
 A Moment in Time: The United Colours of Bronstein - Judy Films. Producer: Judy Jackson
 Witness - Chickens Are People Too - Canadian Broadcasting Corporation. Producers: Charlotte Odele, Marie Natanson, John Kastner, Hilary Armstrong
In the Shadow of a Saint: The Ken Wiwa Story - Nomad Films. Producers: Stephen Milton, Mark Johnston
Kim Campbell: Through the Looking Glass - National Film Board of Canada. Producer: Silva Basmajian

Best Documentary Series
Canada: A People's History - Canadian Broadcasting Corporation. Producers: Mark Starowicz, Hubert Gendron, Gordon Henderson (CBC)
Witness - Canadian Broadcasting Corporation. Marie Natanson, Charlotte Odele, Hilary Armstrong
Life's Little Miracles - Breakthrough Entertainment, Canadian Broadcasting Corporation, Slice. Producers: Kirsten Scollie, Ira Levy, Peter Williamson, Ron Singer
Rainmakers - Adobe Productions. Producers: Robbie Hart, Luc Côté
The View from Here - TVOntario). Producer: Rudy Buttignol
Turning Points of History - History Television. Producers: Frank Savoie, Laszlo Barna, Alan Mendelsohn

Best History/Biography Documentary Program
My Left Breast - Pope Productions. Producer: Paul Pope
Canada: A People's History - Battle for a Continent - Canadian Broadcasting Corporation. Producers: Mark Starowicz, Sally Reardon
Life and Times - Todd McFarlane: The Devil You Know - 90th Parallel Productions, CBC Producer: Silva Basmajian
Life and Times - The Life & Times of Veronica Tennant, Renaissance Woman - 90th Parallel Productions, CBC Producer: Peter Gentile
Unlucky Lady: The Life and Death of HMCS Athabaskan - History Television. Producer: Wayne Abbott
W5 - A Life Forgotten - (CTV). Producers: Tom Clark, Anton Koschany, Peter Findlay, Malcolm Fox

Best Science, Technology, Nature, Environment or Adventure Documentary Program
 Nuclear Dynamite - National Film Board of Canada, Canadian Broadcasting Corporation, Telefilm Canada, Face to Face Media. Producers: Gary Marcuse, Betsy Carson, Selwyn Jacob 
Investigative Reports - Criminal Evidence - Kurtis Productions. Producers: Pauline Duffy, Simcha Jacobovici, Roger Pyke, Elliott Halpern, Jack Rabinovitch
Echoes of the North - Ellis Entertainment. Producers: Ralph C. Ellis, Stephen Ellis
Insectia - Outlaws - Cinétévé, Pixcom, La Cinquième. Producers: Fabienne Servan-Schreiber, Jacquelin Bouchard, Andre Barro, Mary Armstrong
Frontiers of Construction - Movers Not Shakers - Ragged Earth Productions, Barna-Alper Productions. Producers: David Langer, Laszlo Barna, Sam Grana, W. James Hogan
The Nature of Things - The Salmon Forest - Canadian Broadcasting Corporation. Producer: Caroline Underwood

Best News Information Series
W5 - CTV Television Network. Producers: Malcolm Fox, Anton Koschany
Venture - Canadian Broadcasting Corporation. Producers: Alan Habbick, Sophia Hadzipetros
 Exhibit A: Secrets of Forensic Science - Kensington Communications. Producers: Robert Sandler, Robert Lang
Marketplace - Canadian Broadcasting Corporation. Producers: Sharon Hanson, Leslie Peck, Julie Bristow
 Undercurrents - Canadian Broadcasting Corporation. Producers: Pam Bertrand, F.N. Morrison

Best Newscast/News Special
The National/CBC News - October 2 - Canadian Broadcasting Corporation. Producers: Cynthia Kinch, Mark Harrison, Lynn Kelly, Fred Parker, Jonathan Whitten
Canada Now - Air India - Canadian Broadcasting Corporation. Producers: Liz Hughes, Wayne Williams
The National/CBC News - Inside Canada's Prisons - Canadian Broadcasting Corporation. Producers: Stuart Coxe, Cynthia Kinch, Jonathan Whitten, Mark Bulgutch
 CTV National News - Pierre Elliott Trudeau 1919-2000 - CTV News. Producers: Mark Borchiver, Jim Peters
CTV National News - Summit of the Americas - CTV News. Producers: Margaret Spina, Wendy Freeman

Best Talk/General Information Series
The NewMusic - MuchMusic. Producer: Tania Natscheff
That's Hockey - TSN. Producer: Geoff Macht
Pamela Wallin's Talk TV - Canadian Broadcasting Corporation. Producer: Pamela Wallin
 QT: QueerTelevision - CHUM. Irshad Manji, Moses Znaimer, Marcia Martin
 Vicki Gabereau - Canadian Broadcasting Corporation. Producers: Cynthia Ott, Karen Rapp, Jordan Schwartz

Best Lifestyle Series
Skin Deep - Inner City Films, Circle Blue Films. Producers: Amos Adetuyi, Alfons Adetuyi 
Debbie Travis’ Painted House - Whalley-Abbey Media Holdings. Producers: Debbie Travis, Hans Rosenstein
 FashionTelevision - CHUM. Producers: Jay Levine, Moses Znaimer, Marcia Martin
shiftTV - Shift Magazine. Producers: Ian Hannah, Cathie James
The Great Canadian Food Show - Canadian Broadcasting Corporation. Producer: Chris Knight

Best Animated Program or Series
Ollie's Under the Bed Adventures - Decode Entertainment, Collideascope Digital Production. Producers: Steven J.P. Comeau, Jessica Andrews, Michael-Andreas Kuttner
Angela Anaconda - Decode Entertainment/C.O.R.E. Digital Pictures. Producers: Steven DeNure, Neil Court, Joanna Ferrone, John Mariella, Sue Rose, Beth Stevenson, Kym Hyde 
Caillou - Cookie Jar Group, Clockwork Zoo. Producers: Cassandra Schafhausen, Peter Moss, Natalie Dumoulin
Children of Chelm - Breakthrough Entertainment, Pitchi Poy Animation. Producers: Peter Williamson, Ira Levy
Franklin - Nelvana. Producers: Clive A. Smith, Michael Hirsh, Patricia R. Burns, Cynthia Taylor, Stephen Hodgins, Marc Minjauw, Paul Hannequart, Patrick Loubert
Yvon of the Yukon - Studio B Productions, Alliance Atlantis Communications, Corus Entertainment. Producers: Bobby Hsieh, Blair Peters, Chris Bartleman, Tom Pong

Best Pre-School Program or Series
Sesame Park - Canadian Broadcasting Corporation. Producers: Duncan Lamb, Susan Sheehan, Wendy Smith
Land O’ Hands - Radical Sheep Productions, Treehouse TV. John Leitch, Rob Mills
The Nook Counting Network - TVOntario. Producers: Marie McCann, Kim Wilson

Best Children's or Youth Program or Series
Street Cents - Canadian Broadcasting Corporation. Producers: Barbara Kennedy, Robin Johnston, Susan Rogers
Caitlin's Way - Riverwood Productions, Fireworks Entertainment, Lynch Entertainment, Nickelodeon. Producers: Jana Veverka, Adam Haight, Helen White, Jay Firestone
I Was a Sixth Grade Alien - Winklemania Productions, AAC Kids. Producers: Tracey Dodokin, Daphne Ballon, Julie Lacey, Gary Delfiner, Bruce Coville, Maribeth Daley, Ellis Iddon, Philip Meagher
Incredible Story Studios - Mind's Eye Entertainment, Vérité Films. Producers: Robert de Lint, Virginia Thompson, Kieran Corrigan, Mark Reid, Kevin DeWalt
Screech Owls - Oasis Pictures, Shaftesbury Films, YTV, Corus Entertainment. Producers: Christina Jennings, Moira Holmes, John May, Suzanne Bolch

Best Sports Program or Series
Life and Times - Jean Beliveau - 90th Parallel Productions, CBC. Producers: Linda Laughlin, Michael Claydon, Susan Dando
Sports Journal - CBC Sports. Producers: Brenda Irving, Ken Dodd, Tom Harrington, Claude Panet-Raymond, Terry Walker
Hockey Day in Canada - Celebrating the Game - CBC Sports. Producers: Chris Irwin, Joel Darling
Open Ice: Coming of Age - Sportsnet. Producers: Robert MacAskill, Ian Davey
Too Colourful for the League - Canadian Broadcasting Corporation, Diversus Productions. Producers: Max Wallace, Paul Harrington, Evan Beloff, Ari A. Cohen

Best Live Sporting Event
The Scott Tournament of Hearts - Canadian Broadcasting Corporation. Producer: Laurence Kimber 
2000 Summer Olympic Games - Canadian Broadcasting Corporation. Producers: Mike Brannagan, Joel Darling, Terry Ludwick, Don Peppin
CFL on TSN - Wendy's Friday Night Football: BC at Hamilton - TSN. Producers: Jon Hynes, Rick Chisholm, Paul McLean

Best Live Special Event Coverage
CBC News Special: Pierre Elliot Trudeau - A Nation Mourns - Canadian Broadcasting Corporation. Producers: Chris Waddell, Mark Bulgutch, Fred Parker
 @discovery.ca - Chris Hadfield: Spacewalker - Discovery Channel. Producers: Alex Bystram, Penny Park, Jane Mingay
CBC News Special: Federal Election Night - Canadian Broadcasting Corporation. Producers: Fred Parker, Mark Bulgutch, Chris Waddell
CTV National News - Canadian Alliance Leadership Vote - CTV News. Producers: Joanne MacDonald, Tom Haberstroh
The Seventh Annual Giller Prize - Bravo!. Producers: Robert Benson, John Gunn

Best Direction in a Dramatic Program or Miniseries
Jerry Ciccoritti - Chasing Cain (CBC/Salter Street Films)
Jeremy Podeswa - After the Harvest (Alberta Filmworks/Sarrazin Couture Entertainment/Stornoway Communications)
David Wellington - Blessed Stranger: After Flight 111 (Big Motion Pictures/CTV/Salter Street Films)
Yves Simoneau - Nuremberg (Alliance Atlantis/CTV/British American Entertainment/Cypress Films/Les Productions La Fête)
Sturla Gunnarsson - Scorn (Alliance Atlantis/Barna-Alper Productions/CBC/Eurasia Motion Pictures/Face to Face Media Society/Kinetic Productions)

Best Direction in a Dramatic Series
Chris Haddock - Da Vinci's Inquest - It's Backwards Day (Haddock Entertainment/Barna-Alper Productions/Alliance Atlantis/CBC)
Michel Poulette - Bonanno: A Godfather's Story (Armeda/Daniel L. Paulson Productions/Les Productions La Fête)
Helen Shaver - The Outer Limits (Alliance Atlantis/Atlantis Films/Showtime Networks/Trilogy Entertainment)
Michael Robison - The Outer Limits (Alliance Atlantis/Atlantis Films/Showtime Networks/Trilogy Entertainment)
Brent Karl Clackson - The Outer Limits (Alliance Atlantis/Atlantis Films/Showtime Networks/Trilogy Entertainment)

Best Direction in an Information Program or Series
Matt Cowan - Undercurrents - Teen Rebels (CBC) 
Harvey Crossland - Exhibit A: Secrets of Forensic Science (Kensington Communications)
Howard Wiseman - Exhibit A: Secrets of Forensic Science (Kensington Communications)
Nadine Pequeneza - Exhibit A: Secrets of Forensic Science (Kensington Communications)
David Storey - Pet Project (Animal Planet)
Gabriela Schonbach - Quiet Places (Omnifilm Entertainment)

Best Direction in a Documentary Program
Gerry Rogers - My Left Breast (Pope Productions)
John Kastner - Witness - Chickens are People Too (Canadian Broadcasting Corporation) 
Richard Meech - In the Shadow of a Saint: The Ken Wiwa Story (Nomad Films)
Anne Wheeler - The Orkney Lad: The Story of Isabel Gunn (Wheelwright Ink)
Michael McNamara - Wrinkle (Real to Reel Productions)

Best Direction in a Documentary Series
David Tucker - The Nature of Things - Amanda's Choice (CBC)
Robbie Hart - Rainmakers (Adobe Productions)
Patricio Henriquez - Rainmakers (Adobe Productions)
Lindalee Tracey - Toronto: City of Dreams (White Pine Pictures)
Moira Simpson - Titans (Paperny Entertainment)

Best Direction in a Comedy Program or Series
Chris Labonte - John Callahan's Quads! - Maimed Manor (Nelvana/SBS independent/Animation Works/Media World Features/Film Victoria/ScreenWest/Lotteries Commission of Western Australia)
David Steinberg - Big Sound (Peace Arch Entertainment)
Stephen Reynolds - Made in Canada - Teamwork (Salter Street Films/Island Edge)
William G. Elliott - The Red Green Show (Red Green Productions)
Henry Sarwer-Foner - This Hour Has 22 Minutes (Salter Street Films/CBC)

Best Direction in a Variety, or Performing Arts Program or Series
Barbara Willis Sweete - Great Performances: Don Giovanni Unmasked (Rhombus Media/Thirteen/WNET)
Steven Goldmann - Stampede! (CBC)
David New - Dinner at the Edge (Sienna Films)
Shelagh O'Brien - East Coast Music Awards (East Coast Music Association/CBC Halifax)
Barbara Willis Sweete - Four Seasons (Rhombus Media/Veronica Tennant Productions)

Best Writing in a Dramatic Program or Miniseries
Suzette Couture - After the Harvest (Alberta Filmworks/Sarrazin Couture Entertainment/Stornoway Communications)
Michael Amo - Blessed Stranger: After Flight 111 (Big Motion Pictures/CTV/Salter Street Films)
Graeme Manson, John Frizzell - Lucky Girl (Alliance Atlantis/Triptych Media)
Andrew Rai Berzins - Scorn (Alliance Atlantis/Barna-Alper Productions/CBC/Eurasia Motion Pictures/Face to Face Media Society/Kinetic Productions)
Paul Dreskin - The Ride (Mirage Productions/A. Smith & Co. Productions)

Best Writing in a Dramatic Series
Alan Di Fiore, Chris Haddock - Da Vinci's Inquest - It's Backwards Day (Haddock Entertainment/Barna-Alper Productions/Alliance Atlantis/CBC)
Cal Coons - Blue Murder (Barna-Alper Productions/Canwest/North Bend Films)
Frank Borg - Da Vinci's Inquest (Haddock Entertainment/Barna-Alper Productions/Alliance Atlantis/CBC)
Esta Spalding - Da Vinci's Inquest (Haddock Entertainment/Barna-Alper Productions/Alliance Atlantis/CBC)
Scott Peters - The Outer Limits (Alliance Atlantis/Atlantis Films/Showtime Networks/Trilogy Entertainment)

Best Writing in a Comedy or Variety Program or Series
Daryn Jones, Michael MacKinnon, Morgan Smith - Buzz (MTR Entertainment)
Ed Macdonald - Made in Canada (Salter Street Films/Island Edge)
Gord Holtham, John Morgan, Rick Olsen - Air Farce Live (CBC)
Tim Progosh, Laura McGhee - The 2001 Canadian Comedy Awards (The Comedy Network)
Steve Smith, Bob Bainborough, Shaun Graham, Bruce Pirrie, Richard McDonald, Jeff Lumby, Lee Smart - The Red Green Show (Red Green Productions)
Cathy Jones, Peter McBain, Luciano Casimiri, Mark Farrell, Rick Mercer, Kevin White, Greg Thomey, Mary Walsh, George Westerholm - This Hour Has 22 Minutes (Salter Street Films/CBC)

Best Writing in an Information Program or Series
Linden MacIntyre - the fifth estate - Scandal of the Century (CBC) 
Joe Schlesinger - Foreign Assignment (CBC Newsworld)
Debbie Lightle-Quan - Hype & Hope (CBC) 
Catherine Legge - Undercurrents (CBC)

Best Writing in a Documentary Program or Series
Kevin McMahon - Cod: The Fish That Changed The World (Salter Street Films/Primitive Features)
Mort Ransen - Ah the Money, the Money, the Money: The Battle for Saltspring (NFB)
Julie Wheelwright, Penny Wheelwright - The Orkney Lad: The Story of Isabel Gunn (Wheelwright Ink)
Felicia Francescut, Leslie Côté - Through Thick and Thin (High Road Productions)
David Kaufman - Turning Points of History (History Television)

Best Writing in a Children's or Youth Program
Gerard Lewis - Mentors - Klondike Daze (Mind's Eye Entertainment/Anaid Productions)
Ian Weir - Edgemont (CBC/Omnifilm Entertainment)
Alex Pugsley - I Was a Sixth Grade Alien (Winklemania Productions/AAC Kids)
Vito Viscomi - Yvon of the Yukon (Studio B Productions, Alliance Atlantis, Corus Entertainment)

Best Performance by an Actor in a Leading Role in a Dramatic Program or Miniseries
Hugh Thompson - Blessed Stranger: After Flight 111 (Big Motion Pictures/CTV/Salter Street Films)
Peter Outerbridge - Chasing Cain (CBC/Salter Street Films)
Ron White - Heart: The Marilyn Bell Story (Bernard Zukerman/Cinar)
Alec Baldwin - Nuremberg (Alliance Atlantis/CTV/British American Entertainment/Cypress Films/Les Productions La Fête)
Eric Johnson - Scorn (Alliance Atlantis/Barna-Alper Productions/CBC/Eurasia Motion Pictures/Face to Face Media Society/Kinetic Productions)

Best Performance by an Actress in a Leading Role in a Dramatic Program or Miniseries
Elisha Cuthbert - Lucky Girl (Alliance Atlantis/Triptych Media)
Alberta Watson - After the Harvest (Alberta Filmworks/Sarrazin Couture Entertainment/Stornoway Communications)
Nadia Litz - After the Harvest (Alberta Filmworks/Sarrazin Couture Entertainment/Stornoway Communications)
Kate Nelligan - Blessed Stranger: After Flight 111 (Big Motion Pictures/CTV/Salter Street Films)
Sumela Kay - Virtual Mom (Catalyst Entertainment/Miracle Pictures)

Best Performance by an Actor in a Continuing Leading Dramatic Role
Nicholas Campbell - Da Vinci's Inquest - It's Backwards Day (Haddock Entertainment/Barna-Alper Productions/Alliance Atlantis/CBC)
Jeremy Ratchford - Blue Murder (Barna-Alper Productions/Canwest/North Bend Films)
Mark Taylor - Drop the Beat (Back Alley Film Productions)
Gabriel Hogan - The Associates (Alliance Atlantis)
Demore Barnes - The Associates (Alliance Atlantis)

Best Performance by an Actress in a Continuing Leading Dramatic Role
Babz Chula - These Arms of Mine - So Young (Forefront Entertainment/Arms Length Productions)
Maria del Mar - Blue Murder - Partners (Barna-Alper Productions/Canwest/North Bend Films)
Julie Stewart - Cold Squad (Keatley MacLeod Productions/Atlantis Films)
Amanda Tapping - Stargate SG-1 (Stargate SG-1 Productions)
Tamara Hickey - The Associates (Alliance Atlantis)

Best Performance by an Actor in a Guest Role Dramatic Series
Nicholas Campbell - Blue Murder - Steel Drums (Barna-Alper Productions/Canwest/North Bend Films)
Patrick McKenna - Blue Murder (Barna-Alper Productions/Canwest/North Bend Films)
Tim Bissett - Cold Squad (Keatley MacLeod Productions/Atlantis Films)
Winston Rekert - Cold Squad (Keatley MacLeod Productions/Atlantis Films)
Ron Small - These Arms of Mine (Forefront Entertainment/Arms Length Productions)
Frank Moore - Twice in a Lifetime (Pebblehut Productions/Paxson Entertainment/CTV

Best Performance by an Actress in a Guest Role Dramatic Series
Kari Matchett - Blue Murder - Intensive Care (Barna-Alper Productions/Canwest/North Bend Films)
Rosemary Dunsmore - Blue Murder (Barna-Alper Productions/Canwest/North Bend Films)
Allegra Fulton - Blue Murder (Barna-Alper Productions/Canwest/North Bend Films)
Shannon Powell - Da Vinci's Inquest (Haddock Entertainment/Barna-Alper Productions/Alliance Atlantis/CBC)
Cloris Leachman - Twice in a Lifetime (Pebblehut Productions/Paxson Entertainment/CTV

Best Performance by an Actor in a Featured Supporting Role in a Dramatic Program or Miniseries
Brian Cox - Nuremberg (Alliance Atlantis/CTV/British American Entertainment/Cypress Films/Les Productions La Fête)
Gerard Parkes - Blessed Stranger: After Flight 111 (Big Motion Pictures/CTV/Salter Street Films)
Robert Joy - Bonhoeffer: Agent of Grace (NFP Teleart Berlin, Norflicks Productions, Ostdeutscher Rundfunk Brandenburg)
Colm Feore - Haven (Alliance Atlantis/Paulette Breen Productions)
Bruce Greenwood - Haven (Alliance Atlantis/Paulette Breen Productions)

Best Performance by an Actress in a Featured Supporting Role in a Dramatic Program or Miniseries
Sherry Miller - Lucky Girl (Alliance Atlantis/Triptych Media)
Kari Matchett - Criminal Instinct: A Colder Kind of Death (CTV/Carlton America/Shaftesbury Films)
Janet Wright - Chasing Cain (CBC/Salter Street Films)
Lise Roy - Children of My Heart (Buffalo Gal Pictures/Tapestry Films)
Jennifer Dale - Revenge of the Land (Bernard Zukerman Productions/Cinar)

Best Performance by an Actor in a Featured Supporting Role in a Dramatic Series
Garry Chalk - Cold Squad - Loose Ends, Part 2 (Keatley MacLeod Productions/Atlantis Films) 
Gregory Calpakis - Cold Squad (Keatley MacLeod Productions/Atlantis Films)
Stephen E. Miller - Da Vinci's Inquest (Haddock Entertainment/Barna-Alper Productions/Alliance Atlantis/CBC)
Rob LaBelle - First Wave (Sugar Entertainment/Vidatron Entertainment)
Sean Gregory Sullivan - The Associates (Alliance Atlantis)

Best Performance by an Actress in a Featured Supporting Role in a Dramatic Series
Tamara Craig Thomas - Cold Squad - The Box (Keatley MacLeod Productions/Atlantis Films) 
Mimi Kuzyk - Blue Murder (Barna-Alper Productions/Canwest/North Bend Films)
Lisa Ryder - Andromeda (Fireworks Entertainment/Tribune Entertainment/BLT Productions/Global/MBR Productions) 
Marnie McPhail - The Associates (Alliance Atlantis)
Colleen Rennison - These Arms of Mine (Forefront Entertainment/Arms Length Productions)

Best Individual Performance in a Comedy Program or Series
Jason Rouse - Comedy Now! - Jason Rouse: The Series (CTV, Hi Guys Ten Productions)
Glen Foster - Comedy Now! - Glen Foster: That Canadian Guy (CTV, Hi Guys Ten Productions)
Jessica Holmes - Comedy Now! - Jessica Holmes: Holmes Alone (CTV, Hi Guys Ten Productions)
Jonathan Torrens - Jonovision (CBC)
Shaun Majumder - Halifax Comedy Festival (CBC)

Best Ensemble Performance in a Comedy Program or Series
Rick Mercer, Emily Hampshire, Peter Keleghan, Dan Lett, Leah Pinsent - Made in Canada - Alan's Ex (Salter Street Films/Island Edge)
Kim Bubbs, George Buza, Wayne Robson, Steve Smith, Peter Keleghan, Bob Bainborough, Jeff Lumby - The Red Green Show (Red Green Productions)
Rick Mercer, Greg Thomey, Cathy Jones, Mary Walsh - This Hour Has 22 Minutes (Salter Street Films/CBC)
Sandi Ross, Cory Bowles, Sarah Dunsworth-Nickerson, Lucy DeCoutere, John Dunsworth, Mike Smith, John Paul Tremblay, Ardon Bess, Barrie Dunn, Michael Jackson, Jonathan Torrens, Jeanna Harrison, Robb Wells, Patrick Roach - Trailer Park Boys (Showcase, Sunnyvale Productions)
 Peter Keleghan, Leah Pinsent, Dan Lett, Rick Mercer, Jackie Torrens - Made in Canada (Salter Street Films/Island Edge)

Best Performance or Host in a Variety Program or Series
Seán Cullen - Just for Laughs (Just for Laughs Comedy Festival/Les Films Rozon)
 Jonathan Torrens - Jonovision, World Television Appeal (CBC)
John Pinette - Just for Laughs (Just for Laughs Comedy Festival/Les Films Rozon)
Alan Doyle - Juno Songwriter's Circle (Canadian Academy of Recording Arts and Sciences/CBC)

Best Performance in a Performing Arts Program or Series
Rex Harrington - Four Seasons (Rhombus Media/Veronica Tennant Productions)
Dmitri Hvorostovsky - Great Performances: Don Giovanni Unmasked (Rhombus Media/Thirteen/WNET)
Isabel Bayrakdarian - Opening Night (CBC)
Measha Brueggergosman - Opening Night - Beatrice Chancy (CBC)
Alvin Erasga Tolentino - Sola (King Arthur Productions)

Best Performance in a Preschool Program or Series
Eric Peterson - Sesame Park - Old King Cole (Canadian Broadcasting Corporation|CBC)
Natasha LaForce - Polka Dot Door - Polkaroo's Awesome ABCs (TVOntario)
James Rankin - Scoop and Doozie (Queen Bee Productions)
Pier Paquette - Sesame Park (Canadian Broadcasting Corporation|CBC)
Gisèle Corinthios - The Nook Counting Network (TVOntario)

Best Performance in a Children's or Youth Program or Series
Brendan Fletcher - Caitlin's Way - The Easy Way (Riverwood Productions/Fireworks Entertainment/Lynch Entertainment/Nickelodeon)
Lindsay Felton - Caitlin's Way (Riverwood Productions/Fireworks Entertainment/Lynch Entertainment/Nickelodeon)
Vanessa King - Edgemont - This Song's For You (CBC/Omnifilm Entertainment) 
Tyler Kyte - Popular Mechanics For Kids (SDA Productions)
Lee Thompson Young - The Famous Jett Jackson (Alliance Atlantis/Everyone is JP Kids)

Best News Anchor
Peter Mansbridge - The National/CBC News - P.E.T./Town Hall/Election (CBC)
Diana Swain - Canada Now Winnipeg (CBC) 
Lloyd Robertson - CTV National News - Election 2000/Pierre Elliott Trudeau: Final Farewell/Canadian Alliance Leadership Vote (CTV News) 
Sandie Rinaldo - CTV National News - U.S. Presidential Race/Laura Latimer/Election Call (CTV News) 
Lisa LaFlamme - CTV National News - U.S. Election/Quest for the Commons/The Latimer Decision (CTV News)

Best Reportage
Paula Newton - CTV National News - Kidney Selling (CTV News)
Don Murray - The National/CBC News - Belgrade October 2000 (CBC)
Natalie Clancy - The National/CBC News - Innu Crisis  (CBC)
Neil Macdonald - The National/CBC News - Jerusalem 2000 (CBC)
Avis Favaro - CTV National News - Cancer Doctors (CTV News)

Best Information Segment
Marie Caloz, Eve Savory - The National/CBC News - Cost of Survival (CBC)
Morris Karp - Canada Now Winnipeg (CBC) 
Natalie Clancy, Stuart Coxe - CBC News: The Lost People (CBC) 
Dan Bjarnason, Lynn Burgess - The National/CBC News - Look Back in Sorrow (CBC)
Wendy Trueman, Avis Favaro - W5 (CTV)

Best Host or Interviewer in a News or Talk/General Information Program or Series
Wendy Mesley - Undercurrents - Government Ads/Inside Information/Protecting Your Privacy (CBC)
Valerie Pringle - Canada AM (CTV)
Linden MacIntyre - the fifth estate (CBC)
Hana Gartner - the fifth estate (CBC)
Avi Lewis - CounterSpin (CBC Newsworld)

Best Host in a Lifestyle, or Performing Arts Program or Series
David Gale - Loving Spoonfuls - Anja Karppinen (Indivisual Productions)
Debbie Travis - Debbie Travis’ Painted House (Whalley-Abbey Media Holdings) 
Chris Hyndman, Steven Sabados - Designer Guys (WestWind Pictures)
Peter Jordan - It's a Living (CBC Manitoba/Life Network)
Sarah Richardson - Room Service (US) (Nordisk Film & TV)
Carlo Rota - The Great Canadian Food Show (CBC)

Best Sports Broadcaster
Ron MacLean - NHL All Star Break & NHL All Star Game (CBC)
Tom Harrington - 2000 Olympic Summer Games/Sports Journal (CBC Sports)
Brian Williams - 2000 Olympic Summer Games - Daniel Igali/Donovan Bailey/Canadian Trail (CBC Sports)
Steve Armitage - 2000 Olympic Summer Games - Ian Thorpe/Curtis Mayden/Swimming Recap (CBC Sports)
Terry Leibel - 2000 Olympic Summer Games - Show Opening/Panel Interview/Simon Whitfield (CBC Sports)
James Duthie - CFL on TSN - CFL Friday Night Football: BC at Hamilton (TSN)

Best Photography in a Dramatic Program or Series
Guy Dufaux - Haven (Alliance Atlantis/Paulette Breen Productions)
Gregory Middleton - After the Harvest (Alberta Filmworks/Sarrazin Couture Entertainment/Stornoway Communications)
David Moxness - Earth: Final Conflict (Atlantis Films)
Alain Dostie - Nuremberg (Alliance Atlantis/CTV/British American Entertainment/Cypress Films/Les Productions La Fête)
Philip Earnshaw - The Associates (Alliance Atlantis)

Best Photography in a Comedy, Variety, Performing Arts Program or Series
Rene Ohashi - Great Performances: Don Giovanni Unmasked (Rhombus Media/Thirteen/WNET)
Jean Renaud - East Coast Music Awards (East Coast Music Association/CBC Halifax)
Barry Parrell - Four Seasons (Rhombus Media/Veronica Tennant Productions)
Jason Tan - Love Me Madly (Wild Dog Choir/Paulus Productions/BravoFACT)
Michael Balfry - Sola (King Arthur Productions)

Best Photography in an Information Program or Series
Robert Fresco - Exhibit A: Secrets of Forensic Science - Beauty Shop Bandit (Kensington Communications)
Neil Carleton - CBC News: Country Canada (CBC)
Gilles Blais - Her Money (Whalley-Abbey Media)
Jim Cassidy - Hockey Night in Canada (CBC)
Ian Kerr - Quiet Places (Omnifilm Entertainment)

Best Photography in a Documentary Program or Series
David Frazee - Tokyo Girls (NFB)
Michael Sweeney - Canada: A People's History - When the World Began (CBC)
Eric Schurman, Frank Vilaca, Ihor Macijiwsky - The Flight: Departure
John Petrella - Echoes of the North (Ellis Entertainment)
Claude-Julie Parisot, German Gutierrez - Insectia - Outlaws (Cinétévé/Pixcom/La Cinquième)

Best Visual Effects
Noel Hooper, Mark Fordham, Robin Mitchell, Michael Pieczonka - Nuremberg (Alliance Atlantis/CTV/British American Entertainment/Cypress Films/Les Productions La Fête)
Joe Farrell, Geoff Anderson, Roberto Biagi, James Kawano, Darren Marcoux, Jim Finn, Tom Tennisco, Bruce MacDougall - Andromeda (Fireworks Entertainment/Tribune Entertainment/BLT Productions/Global/MBR Productions) 
Robin Hackl, Christine Petrov, Kent Matheson, Wray J. Douglas, Debora Dunphy, Jeremy Hoey, James Tichenor, Judy D. Shane, Erik Ellefsen, Shannon Gurney, Greg Hansen, Craig Van Den Biggelaar - Stargate SG-1 - Small Victories (Stargate SG-1 Productions)
 Marc Roth, Shannon Gurney, Bruce Woloshyn, Craig Van Den Biggelaar, James Tichenor, Michelle Comens, Stephen Bahr, Robin Hackl - Stargate SG-1 - Tangent (Stargate SG-1 Productions)
Steve Anker, Patrick Halm, Lydia Hamilton, Joe Farrell, Tom Tennisco - The Outer Limits (Alliance Atlantis/Atlantis Films/Showtime Networks/Trilogy Entertainment)

Best Picture Editing in a Dramatic Program or Series
Richard Comeau - Heart: The Marilyn Bell Story (Bernard Zukerman/Cinar)
Susan Shipton - Blessed Stranger: After Flight 111 (Big Motion Pictures/CTV/Salter Street Films)
Scott Vickrey - Haven (Alliance Atlantis/Paulette Breen Productions)
Brett Sullivan - Lucky Girl (Alliance Atlantis/Triptych Media)
Dean Soltys - Task Force: Caviar (Big Motion Pictures/Canwest)

Best Picture Editing in a Comedy, Variety, Performing Arts Program or Series
Kevin Cottam, Kris Fleerackers, Andrew Ranford - Sola (King Arthur Productions)
Vesna Svilanovic - A Very Dangerous Pastime: A Devastatingly Simple Dance Guide (National Arts Centre)
James Ho Lim - Dinner at the Edge (Sienna Films)
David Wharnsby - Four Seasons (Rhombus Media/Veronica Tennant Productions)
Allan MacLean, Todd Foster, Keith Bradley, Eric Campbell, Gregg Antworth - This Hour Has 22 Minutes (Salter Street Films/CBC)

Best Picture Editing in an Information Program or Series
Omar Majeed- QT: QueerTelevision - Secrets of Sight (CHUM)
Nick Hector - Birth Stories (Cineflix/Slice/Sky Living)
Tania White - Canada Now Winnipeg (CBC) 
Michael Lloyd - It's a Living (CBC Manitoba/Life Network)
David Stonier, Zsolt Luka - Popular Mechanics For Kids (SDA Productions)

Best Picture Editing in a Documentary Program or Series
Bonni Devlin - Tokyo Girls (NFB)
Trevor Aikman - 13 Seconds: The Kent State Shootings (Partners in Motion/Single Spark Pictures)
Matthew Hornburg - Crossing Bridges
Barry Davis - The Flight: Departure
Daniel Berman - Dewey Time (Blue Train Films)
Kip Spidell - Echoes of the North (Ellis Entertainment)

Best Production Design or Art Direction in a Dramatic Program or Series
Guy Lalande, Frances Calder - Nuremberg (Alliance Atlantis/CTV/British American Entertainment/Cypress Films/Les Productions La Fête)
Louise Middleton - After the Harvest (Alberta Filmworks/Sarrazin Couture Entertainment/Stornoway Communications)
Erica Milo, Taavo Soodor - Haven - Part I (Alliance Atlantis/Paulette Breen Productions)
Jon P. Goulding, Ed Hanna - Relic Hunter - Dagger of Death (CHUM/ProSiebenSat.1 Media/M6/Rysher Entertainment/Gaumont International Television/Fireworks Entertainment)
Brentan Harron, Robert Davidson, Ivana Vasak, Doug McLean, Mark Davidson, Bridget McGuire, Richard Hudolin - Stargate SG-1 (Stargate SG-1 Productions)

Best Production Design or Art Direction in a Non-Dramatic Program or Series
Teresa Przybylski, Graeme Morphy - Great Performances: Don Giovanni Unmasked (Rhombus Media/Thirteen/WNET)
Ricardo Spinacé - Big Sound (Peace Arch Entertainment)
André Viens - The Bewitched Child
Mary Kerr - The Toy Castle (Sound Venture Productions)
Milton Parcher - YAA! The 11th Annual YTV Achievement Awards (YTV)

Best Costume Design
Renée April - The Hound of the Baskervilles (Muse Entertainment)
Lizzie McGovern - After the Harvest (Alberta Filmworks/Sarrazin Couture Entertainment/Stornoway Communications)
Michael Harris - Haven (Alliance Atlantis/Paulette Breen Productions)
Mario Davignon - Nuremberg (Alliance Atlantis/CTV/British American Entertainment/Cypress Films/Les Productions La Fête)
Renée April, Mariane Carter - Revenge of the Land (Bernard Zukerman Productions/Cinar)

Best Achievement in Makeup
Dorota Ergetowski, Joel Echallier, Celine Godeau - Island of Shadows: D'Arcy Island Leper Colony, 1891-1924 (Red Storm Productions)
Katrin Clark-Citroen, Catherine Davies Irvine - I Was a Sixth Grade Alien (Winklemania Productions/AAC Kids)
Micheline Trépanier, Carl Fullerton - Nuremberg (Alliance Atlantis/CTV/British American Entertainment/Cypress Films/Les Productions La Fête)
Diane Simard - Revenge of the Land (Bernard Zukerman Productions/Cinar)
Debra Regnier, Joel Echallier, Fay von Schroeder - The Outer Limits - Glitch (Alliance Atlantis/Atlantis Films/Showtime Networks/Trilogy Entertainment)

Best Overall Sound in a Dramatic Program or Series
Todd B. Warren, Christian Carruthers, Andrew Tay, Robert Woolfson - RoboCop - Prime Directives, Dark Justice (Fireworks Entertainment/Rysher Entertainment/Skyvision Entertainment/Rigel Entertainment)
Steve Foster, Paul Shubat, George Tarrant - After the Harvest (Alberta Filmworks/Sarrazin Couture Entertainment/Stornoway Communications)
Dean Giammarco, William Skinner, Michael Colomby, Tyler Berrie - Da Vinci's Inquest - This Shit is Evil (Haddock Entertainment/Barna-Alper Productions/Alliance Atlantis/CBC)
Véronique Gabillaud, Pierre L'Abbé, Raymond Vermette - Heart: The Marilyn Bell Story (Bernard Zukerman/Cinar)
Claude La Haye, Lou Solakofski, Orest Sushko, Ian Rankin - Nuremberg (Alliance Atlantis/CTV/British American Entertainment/Cypress Films/Les Productions La Fête)

Best Sound Editing in a Dramatic Program or Series
Alice Wright, Diane Boucher, Louis Dupire, Guy Francoeur, Christian Rivest - Bonanno: A Godfather's Story (Armeda/Daniel L. Paulson Productions/Les Productions La Fête)
John Taylor, Michael Colomby, Rick Senechal, Patrick Haskill, Ian Mackie, Don Harrison - Da Vinci's Inquest - This Shit is Evil (Haddock Entertainment/Barna-Alper Productions/Alliance Atlantis/CBC)
Monique Vézina, Serge Fortin, Natalie Fleurant - Heart: The Marilyn Bell Story (Bernard Zukerman/Cinar)
Paul Shikata, Donna G. Powell, Rick Cadger, Ronayne Higginson - Nuremberg (Alliance Atlantis/CTV/British American Entertainment/Cypress Films/Les Productions La Fête)
Devan Kraushar, Cam Wagner, Kirby Jinnah, Jacqueline Cristianini - Scorn (Alliance Atlantis/Barna-Alper Productions/CBC/Eurasia Motion Pictures/Face to Face Media Society/Kinetic Productions)

Best Sound in a Comedy, Variety, or Performing Arts Program or Series
Simon Bowers - Jann Arden: Live at Last (Insight Productions)
Daniel Hamood, John Martin, Ric Rokicki, John Hazen, Steve Hammond - Dinner at the Edge (Sienna Films)
Doug Doctor, Jane Tattersall, Andy Malcolm, Lou Solakofski, Peter Cook, Martin Lee, Mark Shnuriwsky - Great Performances: Don Giovanni Unmasked (Rhombus Media/Thirteen/WNET)
Rico Ciavarella, Peter Lederer, Brian Boyle, Mark Fulton, Doug McClement - Intimate and Interactive (MuchMusic)
David Ramsahoye, Peter Lederer - Live At The Rehearsal Hall (Bravo!)
Brian Power, Neal Gaudet, Kenny MacDonald, P.J. MacNeil, Bob Melanson, David Thomas - This Hour Has 22 Minutes (Salter Street Films/CBC)

Best Sound in an Information/Documentary Program or Series
Ron Searles, Steve Cupani - Canada: A People's History - Battle for a Continent (CBC)
Ric Jurgens, Steve McNamee, Scott Murdoch - A Moment in Time: The United Colours of Bronstein (Judy Films)
Sean Macrae, Michael Nunan - Eco-Challenge Borneo (Mark Burnett Productions)
Dwayne Newman - Counter Force (Red Apple Entertainment)
Lock Johnston, Eric Harwood Davies, Ron Searles - The Nature of Things - The Salmon Forest (CBC)

Best Original Music Score for a Program or Miniseries
Geoff Bennett, Longo Hai, Ben Johannesen - Dinner at the Edge (Sienna Films)
Ron Sures - Blessed Stranger: After Flight 111 (Big Motion Pictures/CTV/Salter Street Films)
 Richard Grégoire - Nuremberg (Alliance Atlantis/CTV/British American Entertainment/Cypress Films/Les Productions La Fête)
Jonathan Goldsmith - Scorn (Alliance Atlantis/Barna-Alper Productions/CBC/Eurasia Motion Pictures/Face to Face Media Society/Kinetic Productions)
Graeme Coleman - The Secret Life of Algernon (Marano Productions/Productions Phare Est)

Best Original Music Score for a Dramatic Series
John Van Tongeren - The Outer Limits - Simon Says (Alliance Atlantis/Atlantis Films/Showtime Networks/Trilogy Entertainment)
Richard Grégoire - Bonanno: A Godfather's Story (Armeda/Daniel L. Paulson Productions/Les Productions La Fête)
Daniel Fernandez, Jack Procher - Redwall - Mattimeo: A Tale of Redwall (Nelvana/Molitor Productions/TV-Loonland AG)
JP Houston - Land O’ Hands (Radical Sheep Productions, Treehouse TV)
Paul Koffman, Tim Foy, Carlos Lopes - Our Hero (Heroic Television/Decode Entertainment)

Best Original Music Score for a Documentary Program or Series
Claude Desjardins, Eric Robertson - Canada: A People's History - When the World Began (CBC)
Christopher Dedrick - Counter Force (Red Apple Entertainment)
Andy McNeil - Cloud of Death
Eric Lemoyne - Faith and Fortune: The Reichmann Story (Handel Productions)
Richard Horowitz - The View from Here (TVOntario))

Special Awards
Gordon Sinclair Award For Broadcast Journalism - Bill Cunningham
Earle Grey Award - Jackie Burroughs
Margaret Collier Award - David Barlow
Gemini Award for Outstanding Technical Achievement - CBC Television - CBC National Satellite DVC Project
Canada Award - Karen Lee, Shan Tam: Made in China: The Story of Adopted Children from China
Academy Achievement Award - Dorothy Gardner
Royal Canadian Mint's Viewer's Choice Award - John Morgan, Luba Goy, Don Ferguson, Roger Abbott - Air Farce Live 
Gemini Award for Most Popular Website Competition - Kim Wilson, Mark Bishop, Marney Berube, Ted Brunt - TVOKids
Gemini Humanitarian Award - Donald Martin

References

Gemini Awards
Gemini Awards, 2001
Gemini Awards